Juraci Moreira (born May 2, 1979 in Curitiba) is a triathlete from Brazil.

Moreira competed at the first Olympic triathlon at the 2000 Summer Olympics.  He took 22nd place with a total time of 1:50:44.79. Four years later, at the 2004 Summer Olympics, Moreira competed again. He fell to 41st in the ranking with a time of 2:02:35.99. He returned to triathlon at the 2008 Summer Olympics where he finished 26th with a time of 1:51:35.57.

References

1979 births
Living people
Brazilian male triathletes
Olympic triathletes of Brazil
Triathletes at the 2000 Summer Olympics
Triathletes at the 2004 Summer Olympics
Triathletes at the 2007 Pan American Games
Triathletes at the 2008 Summer Olympics
Pan American Games medalists in triathlon
Pan American Games silver medalists for Brazil
South American Games silver medalists for Brazil
South American Games medalists in triathlon
Competitors at the 2002 South American Games
Medalists at the 2007 Pan American Games
Sportspeople from Curitiba
20th-century Brazilian people
21st-century Brazilian people